Endurance race may refer to:
Endurance riding
Endurance racing (motorsport)
Long-distance running
Long-distance trail
Long-distance swimming
Adventure race

See also

Ultra-distance cycling
Ultramarathon
Ultra-triathlon
Ski marathon